Priests Ćira and Spira is a 1957 Yugoslav film directed by Soja Jovanović. It was based on Pop Ćira i pop Spira, an 1894 novel by Stevan Sremac. It was the first Yugoslav feature film made in color.

Cast
Ljubinka Bobić as Popadija Sida
Nevenka Mikulić as Popadija Persa
Jovan Gec as Pop Spira
Milan Ajvaz as Pop Ćira
Renata Ulmanski as kćerka pop Spire
Dubravka Perić as kćerka pop Ćire
Ljubiša Jovanović as pop Oluja

References

External links

1957 films
Yugoslav drama films
Avala Film films
Serbian drama films
Films set in Serbia
Films based on Serbian novels
Fictional Serbian people